Caroline Bittencourt (December 13, 1981 – April 28, 2019) was a Brazilian model and television presenter.

Career
In 1997, at the age of fifteen, Bittencourt began her career as a model. Bittencourt had lived in Italy and modelled for designers including Valentino Garavani and Roberto Cavalli. On television, she worked for RedeTV! Bittencourt was a reporter for the Top Report and on RecordTV in the Hoje em Dia programme.

Filmography

Television

Internet

Cinema

Personal life 
Isabelle Bittencourt is her daughter. On January 26, 2019, Bittencourt married businessman Jorge Sestini in a ceremony in São Miguel dos Milagres.

Disappearance and death
Caroline Bittencourt disappeared on the afternoon of 28 April 2019, around 4.30pm, when she was taking a boat trip in Ilhabela, on the coast of state of São Paulo. During a strong storm in the area, the boat capsized, throwing those onboard into the sea. Caroline tried to save her dogs, moving further away from the boat, but drowned. The body of the model was later found by a civilian vessel that was aiding the search for her, near Cigarras Beach, in São Sebastião, about four kilometres from the place where the boat had disappeared. Bittencourt's father said "I jumped in the water to take the body away."

In May 2019, Sestini was indicted for manslaughter, for even though he had thrown himself into the sea to save his wife without success, he was accused of taking a risk when he decided to set out in the boat even though he knew that bad weather was expected that day.  However, in September 2019, the public prosecutor of São Paulo asked the court to close the police investigation, citing a lack of clear evidence that the accused's actions were the proximate cause of Bittencourt's death, and suggesting that "the consequences affecting the investigated (wife's death) have proven to be more harmful than any penalty [that could be] imposed".

References

External links

1981 births
2010s missing person cases
2019 deaths
20th-century Brazilian women
21st-century Brazilian women
Accidental deaths in Brazil
Brazilian female models
Brazilian television presenters
Brazilian women television presenters
Deaths by drowning
Formerly missing people
Missing person cases in Brazil
People from São Paulo
People who died at sea